Arins or Ārinš is a surname. Notable people with the surname include:

 Tony Arins (born 1958), English footballer
 Eižens Ārinš (1911–1987), Soviet KGB secret agent, mathematician, and computer scientist

See also
 Arinsal
 Ariss (surname)